Thomas Gamaliel Bradford (1802-1887) was an American cartographer.

Bradford was born in 1802 in Boston, Massachusetts. He worked for the America Encyclopedia, . He revised and republished Atlas Designed to Illustrate the Abridgement of Universal Geography, Modern & Ancient which was originally created by Adrian Balbi. In 1835, he published A Comprehensive Atlas: Geographical, Historical & Commercial. His work is held in the collection of the Library of Congress and the Boston Public Library.

References

1802 births
1887 deaths
American cartographers
Artists from Boston